The Fifteenth Van Cliburn International Piano Competition took place in Fort Worth, Texas, from May 25 to June 10, 2017.

Commissioned work
All competitors were required to play the commissioned work in their 45-minute Preliminary Round recital. It was Toccata on "L'homme armé", a 4- to 6-minute work composed by pianist-composer jury member Marc-André Hamelin.

Jury

Competition Jury

 Leonard Slatkin, jury chairman 
 Arnaldo Cohen 
 Christopher Elton 
 Marc-André Hamelin 
 Joseph Kalichstein  
 Mari Kodama 
 Anne-Marie McDermott 
 Alexander Toradze

Screening Jury

 Dmitri Alexeev 
 Michel Beroff 
 Janina Fialkowska  
 James Parker 
 Pamela Mia Paul

Awards

Winners of the top prizes:

Applicants
A record 290 entries from 43 countries were received for the competition. On March 7, 2017 the 30 competitors from 17 countries were announced.

Competitors
 Martin James Bartlett, United Kingdom, age 20
 Sergey Belyavskiy, Russia, 23
 Alina Bercu, Romania, 27
 Kenneth Broberg, United States, 23
 Luigi Carroccia, Italy, 25
 Han Chen, Taiwan, 25
 Rachel Cheung, Hong Kong, 25
 Yury Favorin, Russia, 30
 Madoka Fukami, Japan, 28
 Mehdi Ghazi, Algeria/Canada, 28, (he withdrew from the competition)
 Caterina Grewe, Germany, 29
 Daniel Hsu, United States, 19
 Alyosha Jurinic, Croatia, 28
 Nikolay Khozyainov, Russia, 24
 Dasol Kim, South Korea, 28
 Honggi Kim, South Korea, 25
 Su Yeon Kim, South Korea, 23
 Julia Kociuban, Poland, 25
Rachel Naomi Kudo, United States/Japan, 30
 Eun-Ae Lee, South Korea, 29
 Ilya Maximov, Russia, 30
 Sun-A Park, United States, 29
 Leonardo Pierdomenico, Italy, 24
 Philipp Scheucher, Austria, 24
 Ilya Shmukler, Russia, 22
 Yutong Sun, China, 21 
 Yekwon Sunwoo, South Korea, 28
 Georgy Tchaidze, Russia, 29
 Tristan Teo, Canada, 20
 Tony Yike Yang, Canada, 18

Results

References

Van Cliburn International Piano Competition